The 2020 United States presidential election in West Virginia was held on Tuesday, November 3, 2020, as part of the 2020 United States presidential election in which all 50 states plus the District of Columbia participated. West Virginia voters chose electors to represent them in the Electoral College via a popular vote, pitting the Republican Party's nominee, incumbent President Donald Trump, and running mate Vice President Mike Pence against Democratic Party nominee, former Vice President Joe Biden, and his running mate California Senator Kamala Harris. West Virginia has five electoral votes in the Electoral College.

Trump easily carried West Virginia on Election Day by 38.9 points, down from 42.1 points in 2016. Prior to the election, all 16 news organizations declared West Virginia a safe red state.

With 68.62% of its vote, this would prove to be Trump’s second strongest state in 2020, only behind Wyoming, and overall would be the largest share of the vote won by any presidential candidate in West Virginia.

Although West Virginia has become a very safe Republican stronghold in recent elections, Biden is only the third Democrat ever to win the presidency without carrying the state, after Barack Obama and Woodrow Wilson.

Primary elections
The primary elections were originally scheduled for May 12, 2020. In April, they were moved to June 9 due to concerns over the COVID-19 pandemic.

Democratic primary
Vice President Joe Biden won the Democratic primary and received all of West Virginia's 28 pledged delegates, as well as all six unpledged PLEO (party leaders and elected officials) delegates, to the 2020 Democratic National Convention.

Republican primary
Incumbent President Donald Trump won the Republican primary and received all of West Virginia's 35 delegates to the 2020 Republican National Convention.

Mountain (Green) primary
West Virginia's Green Party affiliate conducted an online party-run primary, utilizing the state's original primary date of May 12, 2020, as its deadline.

General election

Predictions

Polling
Graphical summary

Aggregate polls

Polls

Donald Trump vs. Bernie Sanders

Donald Trump vs. Elizabeth Warren

Results
Trump won West Virginia, carrying the popular vote in each of the state's 55 counties.

By congressional district
Trump won all three congressional districts.

By county

Analysis

West Virginia, which was solidly Democratic territory for much of the 20th century, has consistently voted Republican in presidential elections since 2000. Republicans started making gains in the state in the 21st century due to championing of environmentalism by Democrats such as 2000 Democratic nominee Al Gore, which challenged entrenched coal-mining interests.

West Virginia gave Trump his second-highest vote share in 2020, swapping places with Wyoming, after having been Trump's strongest state by vote share in 2016. West Virginia was one of two states where Trump won every county, the other being Oklahoma. The closest county in the state, and the only one Trump won without a majority of the vote, was Monongalia County, home to Morgantown and the main campus of West Virginia University. Trump's margin of victory of 1.24% in Monongalia marked the closest a Democrat has come to winning any county in West Virginia since 2008. This was the third consecutive presidential election where every county within the state voted Republican, but the first since 1996 in which the Democratic vote share increased relative to the preceding election. Biden received 40% of the vote only in 4 counties - Monongalia; Kanawha County, home to state capital and largest city Charleston; Cabell County, home to Marshall University and to the state's second largest city Huntington; and Jefferson County, home to Washington, D.C., exurbs.

Trump's weakening of Obama-era coal emissions standards appeared to benefit him in the state. Per exit polls by the Associated Press, Trump's strength in West Virginia came from White voters who prioritized protecting and expanding production of fossil fuels, such as coal, who comprised 58% of voters and broke for Trump by 90%. Trump's strongest region was southern West Virginia. This coal-mining, union-heavy region was once among the most heavily Democratic places in the nation; Logan County, for example, broke 72% of its ballots for Bill Clinton in 1996, 61% for Al Gore in 2000, 52% for John Kerry in 2004, and even 51% for George McGovern in his only statewide county win in 1972; but by 2008, John McCain flipped it to the Republican column with 54% of the vote, which increased to 68% for Mitt Romney in 2012 and by 2016 and 2020, it had voted 79.6% and 80.9% for Trump, respectively.

During the same election cycle, incumbent Republican Senator Shelley Moore Capito was re-elected by a margin slightly larger than Trump's, beating out Democrat Paula Jean Swearengin by 43.3 points.

Notes

Partisan clients

See also
 United States presidential elections in West Virginia
 2020 United States presidential election
 2020 Democratic Party presidential primaries
 2020 Green Party presidential primaries
 2020 Libertarian Party presidential primaries
 2020 Republican Party presidential primaries
 2020 United States elections
2020 United States Senate election in West Virginia
2020 United States House of Representatives elections in West Virginia

References

External links
 
 
  (State affiliate of the U.S. League of Women Voters)
 

West Virginia
2020
United States presidential